Federal elections were held in West Germany on 5 October 1980 to elect the members of the 9th Bundestag. Although the CDU/CSU remained the largest faction in parliament, Helmut Schmidt of the Social Democratic Party remained Chancellor.

Issues and campaign
Chancellor Helmut Schmidt of the SPD-FDP coalition wanted to be re-elected. The CDU/CSU tried to make their candidate the elected Chancellor, CSU leader Franz Josef Strauß. It was the first time that their candidate was from the CSU. Strauß, immensely popular in Bavaria, found it difficult to appeal to people in other parts of Germany.  One important reason for Strauss's unpopularity compared to Federal Chancellor Helmut Schmidt, was his tendency to talk sharply and militantly about his political opponents.  Schmidt, by contrast, was still seen by many West German voters as a moderate and practical manager and doer, who focused on getting concrete political and economic results more than on political rhetoric.

Results

Results by state

Constituency seats

List seats

Post-election

The coalition between the SPD and the FDP returned to government, with Helmut Schmidt as Chancellor. In 1982, the FDP quit the government, which led to the government's collapse and replacement with a new CDU/CSU – FDP coalition under Helmut Kohl.

Notes

References

Sources
 The Federal Returning Officer
 Psephos

Federal elections in Germany
1980 elections in Germany
Helmut Schmidt
October 1980 events in Europe
1980 in West Germany